Gallirallus is a genus of rails that live in the Australasian-Pacific region. The genus is characterised by an ability to colonise relatively small and isolated islands and thereafter to evolve flightless forms, many of which became extinct following Polynesian settlement.

Taxonomy 
Following recent taxonomic revisions, there is only one known extant species in this genus along with several extinct species of dubious classification, with all other species being moved to Hypotaenidia, Cabalus, or Aptenorallus.

Description
Many of the rails, including the well-known weka of New Zealand, are flightless or nearly so.
Many of the resultant flightless island endemics became extinct after the arrival of humans, which hunted these birds for food, introduced novel predators like rats, dogs or pigs, and upset the local ecosystems. A common Polynesian name of these rails, mainly relatives of G. philippensis, is veka/weka (in English, this name is generally limited to Gallirallus australis).

On the other hand, Gallirallus species are (with the exception of the weka) notoriously retiring and shy birds with often drab coloration.

Living and recently extinct species
In the online list maintained by Frank Gill, Pamela Rasmussen and David Donsker on behalf of the International Ornithological Committee (IOC), the genus contains only one extant species:

These species were placed by BirdLife International and IUCN in the separate genus Hypotaenidia, but are still considered part of Gallirallus by The Clements Checklist of Birds of the World / eBird:

Okinawa rail, Gallirallus okinawae
Barred rail, Gallirallus torquatus
Pink-legged rail, Gallirallus insignis
Roviana rail, Gallirallus rovianae
Guam rail, Gallirallus owstoni – extinct in the wild (late 1980s)
Lord Howe woodhen, Gallirallus sylvestris
Buff-banded rail, Gallirallus philippensis
Dieffenbach's rail, Gallirallus dieffenbachii – extinct (mid-19th century)
Wake Island rail, Gallirallus wakensis – extinct (1945)
Tahiti rail, Gallirallus pacificus – extinct (late 18th – 19th century)
The Calayan rail (formerly Gallirallus calayanensis) was placed into the genus Aptenorallus in 2021.

Species extinct before A.D. 1500
Aside from the weka, all species classified in the genus Gallirallus are only known from subfossil remains, having gone extinct in the Quaternary extinction event. Given the recent taxonomic changes that have led to the weka being the only remaining Gallirallus species, it is possible these may also belong to different genera, but are presently retained in Gallirallus due to uncertainty.
 Astolfo's rail, Gallirallus astolfoi
 Nuku Hiva rail, Gallirallus epulare
 New Ireland rail, Gallirallus ernstmayri
 Ua Huka rail, Gallirallus gracilitibia
 Niue rail, Gallirallus huiatua 
 Tinian rail, Gallirallus pendiculentus
 Aguiguan rail, Gallirallus pisonii
 Mangaia rail, Gallirallus ripleyi
 Tahuata rail, Gallirallus roletti
 Tubuai rail, Gallirallus steadmani
 Huahine rail, Gallirallus storrsolsoni
 Rota rail, Gallirallus temptatus
 Eua rail, Gallirallus vekamatolu – possibly survived to the early 19th century
 Hiva Oa rail, ?Gallirallus sp.
 Norfolk Island rail, Gallirallus sp. - possibly survived to the early 19th century
 Vava'u rail, Gallirallus [Hypotaenidia] vavauensis Worthy & Burley 2020

References

External links

 
Bird genera with one living species